Adrian Hansen (born 21 November 1971) is a South African former professional squash player. He reached a career high of 63 in the world in April 1998. He represented his country in the Commonwealth Games in 2006.

References

External links 
 

1971 births
Living people
South African male squash players
Squash players at the 2006 Commonwealth Games
Commonwealth Games competitors for South Africa
African Games bronze medalists for South Africa
African Games medalists in squash
Competitors at the 2003 All-Africa Games
21st-century South African people